The following is a timeline of the history of the city of Lyon, France.

Prior to 15th century

 43 BCE - Roman colony of Lugdunum founded.
 15 BCE - Ancient Theatre of Fourvière built (approximate date).
 10 BCE - Birth of Claudius.
 59 CE - Town was burned and rebuilt with funding from Nero.
 177 CE - Persecution in Lyon.
 197 - Battle of Lugdunum.
 478 - Became the capital of the Kingdom of the Burgundians.
 1170s - Religious Waldensians active.
 1180 - Lyon Cathedral construction begins.
 1245 - First Council of Lyon convenes.
 1272-1274 - Second Council of Lyon convenes.
 1300 - University of Lyon founded.
 1307 - Lyon becomes part of France under Philip the fair .
 1320 - "Citizens obtained self-rule."
 1381 - Public clock installed.
 1383 - Lyon astronomical clock in operation in the cathedral (approximate date).

15th-18th centuries

 1420 - Trade fairs authorized.
 1454 - Hôtel-Dieu de Lyon (hospital) in operation.
 1473 - Printing press in operation.
 1476 - Lyon Cathedral completed.
 1498 - Maison du Chamarier built.
 1506 - Stock exchange opens.
 1515 -  begins.
 1519 - Collège de la Trinité founded.
 1531 - Hospice de la Charite founded.
 1540 - Printers' strike.
 1548 - Henry II of France and Catherine de' Medici visit city.
 1600 - Marriage of Henry IV of France and Marie de' Medici.
 1617 - Hospice de la Charite church built.
 1651 - City Hall built.
 1655 - Premiere of Molière's L'Étourdi ou les Contretemps.
 1700 -  established.
 1702 - Chamber of Commerce founded.
 1704 - Currency court established.
 1711 - Flood.
 1724 - Academy of fine arts established.
 1731 - Lyon Public Library established. 
 1744 - "Silkworkers' revolt."
 1750 -  development begins.
 1761 -  founded.
 1771 - Conseil Superieur established.
 1775
 20 January: Birth of André-Marie Ampère.
 Saint-Clair bridge opens.
 1778 - Masonic Rectified Scottish Rite founded in Lyon.
 1784 - Montgolfiere hot air balloon ascends from Brotteaux.
 1786 - Weavers' strike.
 1788 - City directory published.
 1790 - City becomes part of the Rhône-et-Loire souveraineté.
 1792 - The first version of the Théâtre des Célestins is inaugurated. 
 1793
 Revolt of Lyon against the National Convention; crackdown.
 City becomes part of the Rhône department.
 Population: 102,167.

19th century

1800s-1840s
 1802 - Jacquard loom invented in Lyon.
 1803
 Museum of Fine Arts of Lyon opens.
 Temple du Change (church) active.
 1806 - Labor court established.
 1807 - Cemetery of Loyasse established.
 1808 - University established.
 1814 - March: Austrians in power.
 1815 - 8 March: Napoleon arrives.
 1820 - Population: 115,841.
 1822
  formed.
 Catholic Society for the Propagation of the Faith founded in Lyon.
 1825 - Statue of Louis XIV installed in the Place Bellecour.
 1830 -  founded.
 1831 - November–December: Canut revolt.
 1834 - April: Canut revolt.
 1835 - Revue du Lyonnais journal begins publication.
 1836 - Brasserie Georges in business.
 1840 - 4 November: Flood.
 1842 - Courthouse built.
 1848
  newspaper begins publication.
 Église Saint-Georges (church) rebuilt.
 1849 - June: Canut revolt.

1850s-1890s
 1850 - 15 August: "Banquet to Louis Napoleon."
 1852 - Arrondissements of Lyon created: 1st, 2nd, 3rd, 4th, and 5th.
 1854 - Gare de Lyon-Vaise opens.
 1855 - Gare de Lyon-Perrache opens.
 1856
 Flood.
 Society of African Missions founded in Lyon.
 Population: 292,721.
 1857 - École centrale de Lyon founded.
 1858 - Lyon–Geneva railway in operation.
 1859 - Le progrès newspaper begins publication.
 1860
 Philharmonic Society founded.
 Palais de la Bourse built.
 1861
 African Museum of Lyon established.
 Population: 318,803.
 1862 - Funicular railway begins operating.
 1863 - Crédit Lyonnais (bank) founded.
 1864 - Grande synagogue de Lyon built.
 1867 - 6th arrondissement of Lyon created.
 1872 - Société botanique de Lyon established.
 1875 - Union générale bank and Catholic University of Lyon established.
 1876 - Gare de Lyon-Saint-Paul opens.
 1877 - Théâtre des Célestins opens.
 1879 -  newspaper begins publication. 
 1880 -  newspaper begins publication. 
 1883
 
 Église du Bon-Pasteur (church) built.
 1884 - Basilica of Notre-Dame de Fourvière built.
 1886 - Population: 401,930.
 1888 -  of Lyon established.
 1890 - Republican monument erected in Place Carnot.
 1891 - Croix-Rousse funicular begins operating.
 1892 - Fontaine Bartholdi installed in Place des Terreaux.
 1894
 29 April: Exposition internationale et coloniale (1894) opens.
 24 June: Assassination of French president Carnot.
 25 June: "Anti-Italian riots."
 Metallic tower of Fourvière and  built.
 1899 - Lyon Olympique Universitaire football club formed.
 1900 - Statue of Carnot erected in the Place de la République.

20th century

1900-1944

 1902 - Revue d'histoire de Lyon journal begins publication.
 1903
 July: 1903 Tour de France passes through Lyon.
 Revue musicale de Lyon begins publication.
 1905
 Orchestre National de Lyon established.
 Édouard Herriot becomes mayor.
 1906 - Population: 430,186 city; 472,114 commune.
 1908 - Gare des Brotteaux opens.
 1911 - Population: 523,796.
 1912 - 7th arrondissement of Lyon created.
 1914 - Exposition internationale urbaine de Lyon held.
 1917 - Berliet automobile manufactory in business.
 1921 - Montluc prison built.
 1926 - Stade de Gerland (stadium) opens.
 1933 - Pathe Bellecour cinema opens.
 1941 - Odeon of Lyon excavation begins.
 1944 - 2 September: Allied forces take city from Germans.

1945-1990s

 1952
 Tunnel de la Croix-Rousse opens.
  Saint-Étienne-Lyon footrace begins.
 Positif film magazine begins publication.
 1959 - 8th arrondissement of Lyon created.
 1964
 9th arrondissement of Lyon created.
 Printing Museum established.
 1968 - Population: 527,800.
 1969 - Urban Community of Lyon and  established.
 1971 - Claude Bernard University Lyon 1 established.
 1973 - Jean Moulin University Lyon 3 established.
 1974 - Lyon metro Line C begins operating.
 1975
Gallo-Roman Museum of Lyon building opens.
Airport Lyon Saint-Exupéry opens.
 Population: 456,716.
 1978 - Lyon Metro Line A and Line B begin operating.
 1980 - Conservatory of Music and Dance established.
 1982
  effected.
 Population: 413,095.
 1983
 TGV hi-speed railway begins operating.
 Opéra National de Lyon founded.
 Gare de Lyon-Part-Dieu opens.
 1987 - 11 May: Barbie Trial begins.
 1989 - Michel Noir becomes mayor.
 1991 - Lyon Metro Line D begins operating.
 1993 - Opéra Nouvel opens.
 1995
 Musée d'art contemporain de Lyon building opens.
 Raymond Barre becomes mayor.
 1997 - Gare de Lyon-Vaise rebuilt.
 1999 - Population: 445,452.

21st century

2000s
 2001
 March:  held.
 Gérard Collomb becomes mayor.
Tram lines T1 and T2 begin operating.
 2005 - Vélo'v bikeshare begins operating.
2006 - Tram line T3 begins operating.
 2008 - Pathe Vaise cinema opens.
2009 - Tram line T4 begins operating.

2010s
 2011 - Population: 491,268.
 2012 
Tram-train de l'ouest lyonnais begins operating.
Tram line T5 begins operating.
 2014
 March:  held.
 Musée des Confluences opens.
 2015
 Metropolis of Lyon established per .
 26 June: Saint-Quentin-Fallavier attack occurs in vicinity of Lyon.
 December:  held.
 2016 - Lyon becomes part of the Auvergne-Rhône-Alpes region.
2019 
Tram line T6 begins operating.
31 August: Mass stabbing kills one and injures eight.

See also
 History of Lyon
 
 
 Other names of Lyon
  department

Other cities in the Auvergne-Rhône-Alpes region
 Timeline of Clermont-Ferrand
 Timeline of Grenoble
 Timeline of St Etienne

References

This article incorporates information from the French Wikipedia.

Bibliography

in English

in French

External links

 Items related to Lyon, various dates (via Europeana).
 Items related to Lyon, various dates (via Digital Public Library of America).

Lyon-related lists
lyon